10 meter running target mixed is one of the ISSF shooting events, in which one shoots an airgun at a target that moves sideways. The target is pulled across a two-meter aisle at a range of 10 meters from the firing point. The target is pulled either slow or fast, and it is visible for 5 or 2.5 seconds, respectively. The difference from 10 meter running target is that the slow and the fast runs are fired in a randomized order that is not known beforehand to the shooter.

The course of fire is 40 shots, divided into two 20-shot stages, each consisting of exactly 10 slow and 10 fast runs.

World Championships, Men

World Championships, Men Team

World Championships, Women

World Championships, Women Team

World Championships, total medals

Current world records 

ISSF shooting events
Rifle shooting sports
10 m mixed